Helen Bowskill  is the Chief Justice of the Supreme Court of Queensland, the highest ranking court in the Australian state of Queensland. She was appointed to Chief Justice on 19 March 2022. She previously served as a judge of the Supreme Court of Queensland (2017–2022), Senior Judge Administrator (2021–22), and a judge of the District Court of Queensland, the Childrens Court of Queensland and the Planning and Environment Court of Queensland (2014–17).

Education 
Bowskill graduated from the Queensland University of Technology in 1995 with a Bachelor of Laws (Honours). Previously, she completed one year of a Bachelor of Arts degree at the University of Queensland, before switching into a communications degree at the Queensland University of Technology.  She then enrolled in the drama program at that university, but only continued until the end of her orientation week.  She then enrolled at the Lorraine Martin Secretarial College and began working as a junior secretary in a barrister’s chamber, which  eventually led to her to pursuing a career as a barrister.

Personal Life 
Bowskill has three daughters, Phoebe, Lucy and Zoe.

References 

Year of birth missing (living people)
Living people
Judges of the Supreme Court of Queensland